Animation is the third solo album by Jon Anderson, a founder-member and former lead singer of Yes. It was released in 1982.

Overview 
Animation was recorded during a busy time for Anderson when he was collaborating with Vangelis and Mike Oldfield and exploring new age and electropop.

As with the previous album Song of Seven, several well-known musicians were involved in Animation, including Simon Phillips, David Sancious,  Jack Bruce and Morris Pert.

The album was produced by producer Neil Kernon who had worked with acts such as Daryl Hall and John Oates and was released on vinyl but no CD version was published until 2006, when a limited edition CD re-release of the album with two bonus tracks was issued by Opio Media. Unfortunately the CD was not made from the original masters but from a worn copy of the vinyl, which led to complaints from purchasers.  The song "All God's Children" was produced by producer Tony Visconti (who had worked with more mainstream British acts such as David Bowie and T. Rex)

"Surrender" and "All in a Matter of Time" were released as singles.

The album was promoted with a world tour on which Anderson performed songs from the album as well as several Yes classics, mostly in medley form.

A follow-up album entitled Chagall was recorded but not released.

One track on the album, "Boundaries", later appeared on other works by Anderson (entitled "O'er" on The Promise Ring) and Yes (entitled "Somehow, Someday" on Open Your Eyes).

For this album,  Anderson met an old friend from the past: Ian Wallace had been playing drums in his band The Warriors in the 1960s before Yes.

In June of 2021, a "Remastered and Expanded Edition" was released by Esoteric Recordings.

Track listing

Side One 
 "Olympia" (4:58)
 "Animation" (9:07)
 "Surrender" (3:53)
 "All in a Matter of Time" (3:06)

Side Two 
 "Unlearning (The Dividing Line)" (4:56)
 "Boundaries" (3:20)
 "Pressure Point" (3:20)
 "Much Better Reason" (4:27)
 "All Gods Children" (4:25)

Bonus tracks 
 "The Spell" (previously unreleased) (11:40)
 "Spider" (B-side of the Atlantic 7" single issue of "Surrender") (2:51)

Personnel 
 Jon Anderson – vocals, acoustic guitar
 Clem Clempson – guitars
 Stefano Cerri – electric bass guitar
 Chris Rainbow – vocals
 David Sancious – keyboards
 Simon Phillips – drums and percussion

Additional musicians
 Dave Lawson : keyboards
 Ronnie Leahy : keyboards
 Blue Weaver : keyboards
 Delmay String Quartet : strings
 Billy Kristian : guitar
 John Giblin : bass guitar
 Jack Bruce : bass guitar
 Ian Wallace : drums
 Brother James : percussion
 Morris Pert : percussion
 Brazil Idiots : Brazilian percussion

Charts

References 

Jon Anderson albums
1982 albums
Albums produced by Tony Visconti
Albums produced by Neil Kernon